Scaritinae is a large subfamily of beetles in the family Carabidae, containing more than 2400 species in over 140 genera. They are found worldwide.

Scaritinae genera
These 146 genera belong to Scaritinae.

Tribe Clivinini Rafinesque, 1815
Subtribe Androzelmina R.T.Bell, 1998
 Androzelma Dostal, 1993
Subtribe Ardistomina Putzeys, 1867
 Ardistomis Putzeys, 1846
 Aspidoglossa Putzeys, 1846
 Kearophus Dajoz, 2004
 Semiardistomis Kult, 1950
Subtribe Clivinina Rafinesque, 1815
 Afrosyleter Basilewsky, 1959
 Ancus Putzeys, 1867
 Basilewskyana Kult, 1959
 Brachypelus Putzeys, 1867
 Cameroniola Baehr, 2000
 Climax Putzeys, 1861
 Clivina Latreille, 1802
 Clivinarchus Sloane, 1896
 Cryptomma Putzeys, 1846
 Lachenus Putzeys, 1846
 Leleuporella Basilewsky, 1956
 Nannoryctes Baehr, 2000
 Nyctosyles Putzeys, 1867
 Orictites Andrewes, 1931
 Platysphyrus Sloane, 1905
 Psilidius Jeannel, 1957
 Pyramoides Bousquet, 2002
 Rhysocara Sloane, 1916
 Rubidiclivina Baehr, 2015
 Rugiluclivina Balkenohl, 1996
 Semiclivina Kult, 1947
 Sinesetosa Balkenohl, 1996
 Syleter Andrewes, 1941
 Thliboclivina Kult, 1959
 Trilophidius Jeannel, 1957
 Trilophus Andrewes, 1927
 Trogloclivina Deuve, 2003
 Whiteheadiana Perrault, 1994
Subtribe Forcipatorina Bänninger, 1938
 Camptidius Putzeys, 1867
 Camptodontus Dejean, 1826
 Forcipator Maindron, 1904
 Kultianella Perrault, 1994
 Mesus Chevrolat, 1858
 Obadius Burmeister, 1875
 Oxygnathopsis Louwerens, 1953
 Oxygnathus Dejean, 1826
 Scolyptus Putzeys, 1861
 Stratiotes Putzeys, 1846
Subtribe Reicheiina Jeannel, 1957
 Alpiodytes Jeannel, 1957
 Asioreicheia Bulirsch & Magrini, 2014
 Catalanodytes Sciaky, 1989
 Dalmatoreicheia Magrini & Bulirsch, 2005
 Dimorphoreicheia Magrini; Fancello & Leo, 2002
 Galicioreicheia Felix & Bulirsch, 2015
 Guiodytes Tian, 2013
 Gymnetoreicheia Magrini; Fancello & Casale, 2019
 Iberodytes Jeannel, 1949
 Ichnusodytes Magrini; Fancello & Onnis, 2019
 Italodytes G.Müller, 1938
 Kenyoreicheia Bulirsch & Magrini, 2007
 Laoreicheia Balkenohl, 2005
 Madagascareicheia Magrini & Bulirsch, 2009
 Malagasyreicheia Magrini; Bulirsch & Fancello, 2021
 Orientoreicheia Bulirsch & Hurka, 1994
 Oxydrepanus Putzeys, 1867
 Parareicheia Jeannel, 1957
 Reicheadella Reitter, 1913
 Reicheia Saulcy, 1862
 Reicheidius Jeannel, 1957
 Sikelioreicheia Magrini & Fancello, 2019
 Spelaeodytes L.Miller, 1863
 Typhloreicheia Holdhaus, 1924
Subtribe Schizogeniina Dostal, 2017
 Baehrogenius Dostal, 2017
 Coryza Putzeys, 1867
 Halocoryza Alluaud, 1919
 Lophocoryza Alluaud, 1941
 Paracoryza Basilewsky, 1952
 Psammocoryza Hogan, 2006
 Schizogenius Putzeys, 1846
Subtribe Sparostesina Dostal, 2017
 Bohemaniella Bousquet, 2002
 Pseudoclivina Kult, 1947
 Sparostes Putzeys, 1867
Tribe Corintascarini Basilewsky, 1973
 Corintascaris Basilewsky, 1952
Tribe Dyschiriini Kolbe, 1880
 Akephorus LeConte, 1852
 Caledyschirius Bulirsch, 2010
 Clivinopsis Bedel, 1895
 Cribrodyschirius Bruneau de Miré, 1952
 Dyschirius Bonelli, 1810
 Neodyschirius Kult, 1954
 Reicheiodes Ganglbauer, 1891
 Setodyschirius Fedorenko, 1996
 Striganoviella Fedorenko, 2012
 Torretassoa Schatzmayr & Koch, 1933
 †Dyschiriomimus Iablokoff-Khnzorian, 1960
Tribe Salcediini Alluaud, 1930
 Holoprizus Putzeys, 1867
 Salcedia Fairmaire, 1899
 Solenogenys Westwood, 1859
Tribe Scaritini Bonelli, 1810
Subtribe Carenina W.J.MacLeay, 1887
 Carenidium Chaudoir, 1868
 Carenum Bonelli, 1813
 Epilectus Blackburn, 1888
 Euryscaphus W.J.MacLeay, 1865
 Laccopterum W.J.MacLeay, 1878
 Monocentrum Chaudoir, 1868
 Mouhotia Laporte, 1862
 Neocarenum Laporte, 1867
 Neoscaphus Sloane, 1888
 Philoscaphus W.J.MacLeay, 1871
 Scaraphites Westwood, 1842
 Trichocarenum Blackburn, 1892
Subtribe Pasimachina Putzeys, 1867
 Pasimachus Bonelli, 1813
Subtribe Scapterina Putzeys, 1867
 Acanthoscelis Dejean, 1825
 Oxylobus Chaudoir, 1855
 Parathlibops Basilewsky, 1958
 Passalidius Chaudoir, 1863
 Scapterus Dejean, 1826
 Steganomma W.J.MacLeay, 1887
 Thlibops Putzeys, 1867
Subtribe Scaritina Bonelli, 1810
 Anomophaenus Fauvel, 1882
 Antilliscaris Lorenz, 1998
 Baenningeria Reichardt, 1976
 Coptolobus Chaudoir, 1857
 Crepidopterus Chaudoir, 1855
 Cryptoscaphus Chaudoir, 1855
 Dinoscaris Alluaud, 1902
 Distichus Motschulsky, 1858
 Dyscaris Bänninger, 1940
 Dyscherinus Jeannel, 1955
 Dyscherus Chaudoir, 1855
 Geoscaptus Chaudoir, 1855
 Glyptogrus Bates, 1875
 Gnaphon Andrewes, 1920
 Haplogaster Chaudoir, 1879
 Haplotrachelus Chaudoir, 1855
 Macromorphus Chaudoir, 1857
 Madascaris Bänninger, 1938
 Mamboicus Bates, 1886
 Mecynoscaris Alluaud, 1930
 Menigius Chaudoir, 1879
 Neochryopus Bänninger, 1932
 Ochyropus Schiödte, 1847
 Pachyodontus Chaudoir, 1879
 Paradyscherus Basilewsky, 1971
 Pilades Heyne, 1895
 Prodyscherodes Jeannel, 1955
 Prodyscherus Jeannel, 1946
 Scarites Fabricius, 1775
 Storthodontus Chaudoir, 1855
 Tapinoscaris Jeannel, 1946
 Tibioscarites Bänninger, 1929
 Tonkinoscaris Bänninger, 1956
 Typhloscaris Kuntzen, 1914

References

 
Carabidae subfamilies
Taxa named by Franco Andrea Bonelli